Samurai Warriors 5, known in Japan as , is a hack and slash game by Koei Tecmo, and a reboot of the Samurai Warriors series, part of the long-running Warriors series of hack and slash games published by Koei Tecmo. Announced during a Nintendo Direct presentation on February 17, 2021, the game was stated to be a "fresh re-imagining" of the franchise, featuring an all-new storyline, revamped character designs, and a new visual presentation. It was released in Japan in June 2021 for the Nintendo Switch, PlayStation 4, Xbox One, with a worldwide release in July 2021 for those platforms and PC via Steam. A version for Amazon Luna was made available on June 30, 2022.

Gameplay
Like previous games, the game is a hack and slash, in which the player faces against hundreds of enemy soldiers in a battlefield, with the objective usually being the defeat of an enemy commander. The game features a new Hyper Attack, which allows the player to traverse great distance while attacking enemies, and Ultimate Skill, augments that, depending on their type, can be used to continue combos, regenerate Musou Gauge, stun enemies, or deal a barrage of attacks. The game uses an art style resembling traditional Japanese painting.

Story
The game's scope of the Sengoku period is limited in contrast to previous games. Samurai Warriors 5 focuses on events leading up to the Honnō-ji Incident, with Nobunaga Oda and Mitsuhide Akechi being the prominent figures of the story.

Characters
The entire cast of characters has been vastly redesigned from previous incarnations (with the exception of Katsuyori Takeda, who retains his original design from Samurai Warriors: Spirit of Sanada). The amount of playable characters has also been cut when compared to the previous mainline game, Samurai Warriors 4 (which featured 55 playable characters), with only 37 playable characters being featured, 21 returning and 16 new (10 of the characters are Supporting Characters which means that they are not playable in Story Mode, and do not have unique Power Attacks, and a unique Ultimate Skill).

* Denotes Supporting Characters who are not playable in Story Mode, and do not feature unique Power Attacks, and a unique Ultimate Skill
** Denotes characters with two playable versions consisting of Youth, and Mature counterparts

Music
Unlike the electronic and traditional Japanese music collaborations in the previous Samurai Warriors games, Samurai Warriors 5 largely replaces the electronic music in favour of rock and orchestral music, while keeping the traditional Japanese music entirely intact.

Reception

The game has received "generally favorable" reviews according to Metacritic, becoming the highest rated entry in the series. Famitsu gave all versions of the game scores of 9/9/8/9 for a total of 35/40. The game sold a total of 94,366 physical copies during its first week on sale in Japan (PS4: 55,675/Switch: 38,691) with the PS4 version being the second best-selling game of the week, and the Switch version being the third best-selling game of the week.

References

External links
 Official North American site
 Official European site

2021 video games
Crowd-combat fighting games
Koei Tecmo games
Nintendo Switch games
PlayStation 4 games
Video games about samurai
Samurai Warriors
Video games developed in Japan
Video games set in feudal Japan
Windows games
Xbox One games
Multiplayer and single-player video games